Megalancistrus barrae is a species of armored catfish endemic to Brazil where it is found in the São Francisco River basin.  This species grows to a length of  SL.

References 
 

Ancistrini
Fish of the São Francisco River basin
Endemic fauna of Brazil
Fish described in 1910